Sarojini Mehta (1898-1977) was a Gujarati short story writer from Gujarat, India.

She was born in 1898 to Ramanbhai Nilkanth and Vidyagauri Nilkanth who were social reformers and writers. She graduated in 1919 and studied sociology in 1923 from London School of Economics. She served as a superintendent at the Vanita Vishram, Ahmedabad. She married Nanak Mehta, younger brother of Sumant Mehta.

She had written short story collections: Ekadashi (1935), Char Patharani Ma (1953) and Valata Pani (1962). She wrote on society, family, child marriage and position of women in society.

See also 
 List of Gujarati-language writers

References

1898 births
1977 deaths
Women writers from Gujarat
19th-century Indian women writers
19th-century Indian writers
20th-century Indian women writers
20th-century Indian writers
Writers from Ahmedabad
Nilkanth family
Alumni of the London School of Economics